The Bulgarian Secret Revolutionary Brotherhood was organized from a small group of Bulgarian conservatives, adherents of evolutionary methods of struggle, in Salonica. 

In 1897, in the face of the growing power of Internal Macedonian Revolutionary Organization (IMRO), these moderates, led by Ivan Garvanov, who was then a teacher at the  Bulgarian Men's High School of Thessaloniki, set up a rival organization, called Revolutionary Brotherhood, which entered into friendly relations with the Macedonian Supreme Committee and began setting up branches in various towns throughout Macedonia and Southern Thrace. Inevitably, the Brotherhood clashed with the Bulgarian Macedonian-Adrianople Revolutionary Committees (BMARC), and there were even mutual attempts at assassination, although nobody was actually killed. When Boris Sarafov was elected to the leadership of the Macedonian Supreme Committee, with the help of Bulgarian Exarchate he managed to effect a reconciliation, and in 1899, the Brotherhood was dissolved and its members joined the IMRO. Its members as Ivan Garvanov, were to exert a significant influence on the Internal Organization. They were to push for the Ilinden-Preobrazhenie Uprising and later became the core of IMRO right-wing faction.

See also
Macedonian Question
Secret society

References and notes 

Bulgarian revolutionary organisations
1890s in Bulgaria
Political history of Bulgaria
Secret societies in Bulgaria
Macedonia under the Ottoman Empire
1897 establishments in the Ottoman Empire
Organizations established in 1897
Internal Macedonian Revolutionary Organization
Revolutionary organizations against the Ottoman Empire
Organizations based in Thessaloniki
Macedonian Question